Amir Ghaseminejad (born in 1985 in Mashhad) was an Iranian judoka.

He competed for Iran at the following tournaments:
2011 Asian Judo Championships, Bronze Medal
2011 World Judo Championships, Quarter Finals
2011 Grand Slam, Brazil
2012 Asian Judo Championships, Bronze Medal
2012 World Cup, Prague

References

External links
 

Living people
Sportspeople from Mashhad
Iranian male judoka
Year of birth missing (living people)
Judoka at the 2014 Asian Games
Asian Games competitors for Iran
20th-century Iranian people
21st-century Iranian people